Diana Haight (born 28 April 1964) is a Canadian former alpine skier who competed in the 1984 Winter Olympics.

References

External links
 

1964 births
Living people
Canadian female alpine skiers
Olympic alpine skiers of Canada
Alpine skiers at the 1984 Winter Olympics